Hollywoo is a 2011 French comedy film directed by Frédéric Berthe and Pascal Serieis.

Plot
Jeanne Rinaldi makes a living by dubbing Jennifer Marshall in a TV series (L.A Couples). When she learns that Jennifer has given up her role, Jeanne flies to Hollywood to convince her to return to the series. There, she meets Farres, who opens the doors of the star system for her.

Cast

 Florence Foresti as Jeanne Rinaldi
 Jamel Debbouze as Farres
 Nikki DeLoach as Jennifer Marshall
 Muriel Robin as Michèle
 Sophie Mounicot as Marie
 Robert Maschio as Goldman
 Alex Lutz as Jean-Philippe
 Jérôme Commandeur as Bob
 Jeff Roop as Mike
 Kirk B. R. Woller as Jordan
 Demetrius Grosse as Gangsta
 Irina Voronina as Gruth
 Laurie Searle as Ms. Steinhauer
 Grégoire Bonnet as Cédric
 Jack Brand as Jerry Flash
 Momo Casablanca as Slimane
 John Gleeson Connolly as Detective Starsky
 Marc Raducci as Detective Hutch
 Régis Gaudrot as Croco
 Chieko Hidaka as Cindy
 Min Man Ma as Daniel
 John Sanderford as Marlow
 Carrie Stevens as Marlow's girlfriend
 Odile Schmitt as Pénélope
 Jared Ward as Howard
 Charlie Weirauch as MC
 Guillaume Dabinpons as Gilles
 Anna Mountford as Genevieve
 Shira Scott Astrof as Eva
 Manel Souza as Guy
 Trae Ireland as W. Smith
 C.J. Jimenez as Pamela
 Karine Valmer as Sabine
 Frank Novak as The Palace man
 Rakefet Abergel as The assistant
 Kaitlyn Black as The Hostess VIP Room
 Zak Knutson as The Guardian at Paramount
 Karl Lagerfeld as himself

References

External links
 

2011 films
French comedy films
2010s French-language films
2011 comedy films
2010s French films
Foreign films set in the United States